Heba Allejji (born 20 January 1997) is a Syrian table tennis player.

She competed at the 2016 Summer Olympics in Rio de Janeiro, in the women's singles. She did not qualify for the games in the normal way but was invited to participate by the Tripartite Commission, through a system which aims "to provide universal representation as a fundamental aspect of the Olympic Games".

References

External links

1997 births
Living people
Syrian female table tennis players
Olympic table tennis players of Syria
Table tennis players at the 2016 Summer Olympics
People from Al-Hasakah